Pei Shan Lee also known as Lee Pei Shan (born 15 September 1999) is a Singaporean netball player who represents Singapore internationally and plays in the position of goal shooter. She was part of the Singaporean squad at the 2019 Netball World Cup, which was also her first World Cup appearance. 

In September 2019, she was included in the Singaporean squad for the 2019 M1 Nations Cup.

References 

1999 births
Living people
Singaporean netball players
Southeast Asian Games medalists in netball
Southeast Asian Games silver medalists for Singapore
Competitors at the 2019 Southeast Asian Games
2019 Netball World Cup players
Singaporean sportspeople of Chinese descent
21st-century Singaporean women